Akrukay (or Chini) is a Ramu language of Papua New Guinea. It is spoken in the two villages of Akrurai and Andamang in Akrurai ward, Arabaka Rural LLG, Madang Province.

References

External links 
 ELAR archive of Documentation and analysis of Andamang Chini
 Akrukay word list, part of the Rosetta Project

Tamolan languages
Languages of Madang Province